Marsh Barton railway station is a station under construction in the Marsh Barton area of Exeter, Devon. The station will be located on the Riviera Line between Exeter St Thomas and Starcross stations. Marsh Barton is identified as a strategic employment area in local planning policy, and the new station will support employment development.

History
Plans for the station were developed by Network Rail and Devon County Council as part of the "Devon Metro" proposal.

Work was due to start on the station in early 2017, and Devon County Council hoped that it would be open in December 2017. Construction work actually began in April 2021, and the station was expected to be open for passengers by the end of 2022, although it still had not opened by the end of December.

In an update in April 2020, officers of Devon County Council said that a decision had been made to prioritise this station over a possible reopening of Exminster railway station.

The station will be located off Clapperbrook Lane East, adjacent to an energy from waste (EfW) plant.

Services
The station will be located between Exeter St Thomas and Starcross railway stations, being served by Great Western only.

References

External links

Proposed railway stations in England